Double Nickels is a 1977 car chase action-comedy starring Jack Vacek, Patrice Schubert, Ed Abrams, George Cole, Michael "Mick" Brennan, and Tim "Tex" Taylor. Vacek also wrote, produced, and directed the film.

Cast
 Ed Abrams as Ed
 Mick Brennan as Mick
 George Cole as George
 Michael Cole as Mike
 Larry Dunn as Mechanic
 Patrice Schubert as Jordan
 Jack Vacek as Smokey

Plot
Two highway patrolmen who believe that they are making extra money on the side repossessing cars come to realize that they are actually involved in a car theft ring.

Production
The film was shot in Los Angeles and contains a chase through the Los Angeles River Basin.

Reception
Variety described the film as "more empty calories for junk-film fans; cheap but tasty".

Re-release
The film was re-released theatrically in 1978 under the title Split-Second Smokey.

References

External links 
 
 
  
 

1977 films
1970s action comedy films
1970s chase films
American chase films
American action comedy films
Films about automobiles
Films about police officers
Films set in Los Angeles
Films shot in Los Angeles
1977 comedy films
1970s English-language films
1970s American films